Greatham may refer to:

Greatham, County Durham
Greatham, Hampshire
Greatham, West Sussex

See also
Greetham (disambiguation)